Victor Lind (born 15 December 1940) is a Norwegian painter and sculptor. His teachers and inspirators include Chrix Dahl, Alf-Jørgen Aas and Rolf Nesch. Two of his works are located at the National Museum of Art, Architecture and Design. Among his works is also a controversial statue of Knut Rød.

References

External links
Å blomstre - for noen
Victor Lind. Norsk kunstnerleksikon

1940 births
Living people
20th-century Norwegian painters
21st-century Norwegian painters
Norwegian male painters
20th-century Norwegian male artists
21st-century Norwegian male artists